The Type 99 (Hako-Baku-Rai) mine was a Japanese anti-tank weapon used during the Second World War. It entered service in 1939. Four magnets were attached to the casing made of hemp cloth, along with an external fuze. The fuze had a time delay, which enabled it to be used as an anti-tank hand grenade, or a demolition charge. Once the safety pin was removed, it was armed, striking the fuze ignited a powder delay train. The mine detonated after a five to ten seconds delay, giving enough time for it to be thrown.

The mines could be stacked, held together by the magnets for greater effect. When used individually the mine could penetrate approximately 0.75 inches (19 mm) of steel, with two mines stacked it can penetrate 1.25 inches (32 mm) of steel.

Specifications
 Length of fuse:

References

 https://web.archive.org/web/20050219144251/http://www.ibiblio.org/hyperwar/Japan/IJA/HB/HB-9-2.html
 http://www.inert-ord.net/jap02h/grenades/t99mag/index.html

Anti-tank mines
Land mines of Japan
World War II infantry weapons of Japan
Military equipment introduced in the 1930s